Polina Seronosova (born 22 January 1993) is a Belarusian cross-country skier who competes internationally.

She competed for Belarus at the FIS Nordic World Ski Championships 2017 in Lahti, Finland.

References 

1993 births
Living people
Belarusian female cross-country skiers
Cross-country skiers at the 2018 Winter Olympics
Olympic cross-country skiers of Belarus
Tour de Ski skiers